George Alexander McLean Buckley (1866–1937) ventured partway to Antarctica with the Nimrod Expedition led by Ernest Shackleton.

An Ashburton sheep farmer born in Christchurch, New Zealand, Buckley holds the distinction of being the last to join Shackleton's expedition, having secured passage aboard merely two hours prior, pleading with Shackleton personally to be transported as far as the pack ice and then rushing to gather his effects in time. “Surely a record in the way of joining a Polar expedition,” Shackleton is reported to have said at the time.

Buckley did not travel with the expedition all the way to Antarctica proper, but only as far as the pack ice, at which point he transferred to another ship, the Koonya, which had towed the Nimrod up to that point, allowing the latter to reserve its coal fuel for exploring the region. But in his time with the Nimrod and despite being something of a tourist, Buckley gained admiration from his shipmates for his willingness to work and time spent caring for the animals aboard. So while the crew of the Koonya slaughtered 10 sheep on deck and sent the carcasses to the Nimrod as fresh meat for their further journey, the sailors of the Nimrod gave Buckley a champagne toast before sending him home aboard that other ship.

A photograph can be found of Buckley, Lieutenant Jameson Boyd Adams (Nimrod second-in-command and meteorologist) and Dr. Alistair Forbes Mackay, assistant surgeon, standing in the rigging of the Nimrod, with the Koonya in the background.

References

Explorers of Antarctica
1866 births
1937 deaths